Hood River Valley High School is a public high school in Hood River, Oregon, United States. It  opened in September 1970 as the result of a consolidation of the former Hood River and Wy'East high schools.

Academics
Hood River Valley High School is a Title 1 school.

The school has a dropout rate of 2.8% and an attendance rate of 94%. Of the 38% of students who took the SAT, the average verbal score was 504 and the average math score was 507. In the 2006 Oregon Statewide Assessments, the score for reading was 57%, the state average being 55%. For science, the score was 50%, below the state average of 62%. In writing the score was 55%, equal to the state average of 55%. The score for math was 38%, and the state average was 45%.

In 2008, 76% of the school's seniors received a high school diploma. Of 314 students, 238 graduated, 53 dropped out, five received a modified diploma, and 18 were still in high school in 2009.

Advanced Placement courses (2020-2021) 

 English Literature and Composition
 English Language and Composition
 Chemistry
 Physics 1
 Physics 2
 Calculus AB
 Calculus BC
 United States History
 Government and Politics: United States
 Spanish Language
 Studio Art: 2D Design
 Studio Art: 3D Design
 Studio Art: Drawing
 Human Geography
 Statistics
 Computer Science Principles
 Computer Science A
 Biology

Athletics
Hood River Valley High School is a 5A school in the Columbia River Conference of the OSAA.

Hood River Valley won the 2014 and 2015 5A Soccer State Championships.

Hood River Valley has won two 5A Baseball State Championships, the most recent in 2015, when they beat the Liberty Eagles 2-0. In 1980 HRV also won the state championship, and were buoyed by Mike Christopher throwing the only perfect game in Oregon State Championship Baseball history.

Hood River Valley won their first ever boys 5A Track and Field State Championship in 2016.

The Hood River Valley's Boys Water Polo team also had a historic first state title in 2019.

The Hood River's Girls Water Polo team won back to back state championships in 2016 and 2017. They won a third state championship in 2019, after taking second in 2018. The Water Polo program was only established in 2014, meaning that HRV won 3 state championships in five years. The water polo team is also underfunded. Despite this they've still managed to create a winning team.

Activities
Hood River Valley High School has operated a team in the FIRST Tech Challenge since 2016, called "Steelhead". The team has consistently qualified for the FIRST Championship almost every year. Steelhead is often ranked 1st in Oregon.

Notable alumni
 Andrew Baldwin, Class of 2001, baseball player, Tacoma Rainiers
 Dylan Bauld, Class of 2009; Zach Grace and McKinley Kitts, Class of 2010, of the Los Angeles-based indie pop band Flor 
 Travis Bowe, Class of 1999 - writer, producer and voice-over actor, Family Guy, The Cleveland Show, Tosh.0  
 Jeff Lahti, Class of 1974, St. Louis Cardinals pitcher; orchardist in Hood River, Oregon

References

Public high schools in Oregon
Buildings and structures in Hood River, Oregon
Schools in Hood River County, Oregon